Saint-Nom-la-Bretèche–Forêt de Marly is a railway station in the French commune of L'Étang-la-Ville in the département of Yvelines.  Its name derives from Saint-Nom-la-Bretèche and the Forêt de Marly.  It links to the CSO bus line 1.

It is one of the western termini of Line L of the Transilien Paris-Saint-Lazare suburban railway, made up of one platform between two lines.

Tram station 
It is served by Île-de-France tramway Line 13 Express which opened in 2022 largely using track of the existing Grande Ceinture line, towards Saint Cyr and Saint-Germain-en-Laye.

References

External links
 

Railway stations in Yvelines
Railway stations in France opened in 1889